Buddhism is a minority religion in Mexico, numbering 108,701 followers or 0.09% of the total Mexican population.

Tibetan Buddhism
Casa Tibet México (headquartered in the Colonia Roma of Mexico City) was the third of the Tibet Houses to be created. It was founded by the XIV Dalai Lama on his first visit to Mexico. One of the main objectives of the Casa Tibet is to combat the esoteric New Age beliefs that surround eastern cosmogony and to disseminate and preserve true Tibetan culture and spirituality.

The current Director, Lama Marco Antonio Karam, was chosen by the Dalai Lama to head the Casa Tibet. Another important mission the Casa Tibet participates in is the sponsoring of Tibetan children located in Dharamshala, India. In Mexico, they have given help to street children, Indigenous children and single mothers. The Casa Tibet does not proselytize, but will not refuse an individual wanting to learn about Tibetan ideology.

Other denominations
At a Thai Buddhist temple in Tamaulipas, there are 3 monks from Thailand that teach the religion, as well as one monk from Cambodia.

See also 
 Buddhism in Brazil
 Buddhism in Venezuela
 Buddhism in Argentina
 Buddhism in Costa Rica
 Buddhism in Nicaragua
 Buddhism in Canada
 Buddhism in the United States
 Buddhism in Central America
 Religion in Mexico

References

External links
 Shaolin Daxue
 Casa Tibet México
 Centro Mexicano del Buddhismo Theravada
 Serlingpa Retreat Center, located in Michoacán, owned by the FPMT Organization founded by Tibetan Lama Thubten Yeshe and Lama Zopa.
 Zen Centers in Mexico

 
Mexico